Final Sacrifice is a Magic: The Gathering novel by Clayton Emery published by Boxtree in 1995.

Plot summary
Final Sacrifice is a Magic: The Gathering novel involving a tale of duelling wizards, with the archdruid Greensleeves and her brother Gull against Towser.

Reception
Anderson-Forsyth reviewed Final Sacrifice for Arcane magazine, rating it a 7 out of 10 overall. Forsyth comments that "This book adds a rich and detailed background to the Magic universe, and is an enjoyable and unpredictable read. An additional incentive is the bonus of a limited edition Magic card not generally available – a very tempting offer for any collector."

Reviews
Review by Lynne Bispham (1996) in Vector 188

References

1995 novels
Novels based on Magic: The Gathering